Alexandru Gațcan (born 27 March 1984) is a Moldovan former international footballer who played as a central midfielder.

Career

Club
On 17 June 2019, Gațcan extended his contract with Rostov until the summer of 2020. On 17 July 2019, Rostov announced that Gațcan would leave the club after their match against Spartak Moscow on 20 July, ending his 11-year stint at the club.

On 23 July 2019, he joined Russian Premier League club Krylia Sovetov Samara.

International
Gațcan played 2 games in 2006 FIFA World Cup qualification (UEFA) and 7 games in UEFA Euro 2008 qualifying. Gațcan has appeared in 46 matches for the Moldova national football team, scoring three goals.

Personal life
In 2007, Gațcan became a naturalized citizen of Russia.

Career statistics

Club

Notes

International

Statistics accurate as of match played 18 November 2018

International goals
Scores and results list Moldova's goal tally first.

Honours
FC Rostov
Russian Cup: 2013–14

Individual
Moldovan Footballer of the Year: 2013, 2015, 2016, 2017

References

External links

Profile at Rubin 
 Statistics at Statbox.ru 

1984 births
Living people
Moldovan footballers
Moldovan expatriate footballers
Moldova under-21 international footballers
Moldova international footballers
Association football midfielders
Moldovan Super Liga players
FC Rubin Kazan players
FC Rostov players
Russian Premier League players
Expatriate footballers in Russia
FC Spartak Moscow players
PFC Krylia Sovetov Samara players
FC Spartak Nizhny Novgorod players